The R396 is a Regional Route in South Africa that connects the N2 north of Mthatha to Lady Frere via Maclear, Rhodes, Barkly East, and Indwe.

See also
R306 (Eastern Cape)

External links
 Routes Travel Info

References

Regional Routes in the Eastern Cape